Cunnell is a surname. Notable people with the surname include:

 Bob Cunnell (1942–2023), English cricketer
 Clifford Cunnell (born 1944), English cricketer, brother of Bob
 Donald Cunnell (1893–1917), British aviator

See also
 Connell (surname)